Jared Savage (born March 2, 1997) is an American professional basketball player who last played for the Ontario Clippers of the NBA G League. He played college basketball for the Austin Peay Governors and the Western Kentucky Hilltoppers.

High school career
Savage attended Warren Central High School. He played six Region 4 Tournament games during his career. As a senior, he averaged 17.8 points and 8.9 rebounds per game, leading the Dragons to a 23–9 season before losing to Bowling Green High School 46–43 for the 4th region Championship. Savage was not highly recruited, regarded as a two-star prospect according to Verbal Commits and was not ranked by 247Sports, Rivals or ESPN. Savage signed with his father's alma mater, Austin Peay.

College career
As a freshman, Savage averaged 6.4 points per game. He helped the Governors win the Ohio Valley Conference Tournament by making 19 3-pointers across four games. He posted 24 points, 9 rebounds, and 2 assists in the title game against UT Martin, earning All-Tournament Team recognition. Savage became a starter as a sophomore, averaging 10.3 points and 4.4 rebounds per game and made 57 three-pointers. He transferred to Western Kentucky after his sophomore season when Austin Peay coach Dave Loos retired, after considering Lipscomb. Savage averaged 12.2 points and 4.8 rebounds per game and had 14 blocked shots as a redshirt junior. During the beginning of his senior season, Savage served as a secondary scorer to Charles Bassey but emerged as a primary threat after Bassey's season-ending injury. He posted 24 points and 16 rebounds against UTSA on February 15, 2020. As a redshirt senior, Savage averaged 11.7 points and 7.1 rebounds per game. His college career came to an end when the COVID-19 pandemic caused the cancellation of the Conference USA Tournament. Savage was named to the Third Team All-Conference USA as well as the Defensive Team.

Professional career

Lavrio (2020–2021)
On July 20, 2020, Savage signed his first professional contract with Lavrio of the Greek Basket League. 

On July 15, 2021, he signed with the Crailsheim Merlins of the German Basketball Bundesliga (BBL). He averaged 5.3 points and 2.5 rebounds per game. 

On March 6, 2022, Savage returned to Lavrio for the rest of the season. In 10 league games, he averaged 9.4 points and 5 rebounds, playing around 25 minutes per game.

Ontario Clippers (2022)
On October 24, 2022, Savage joined the Ontario Clippers training camp roster. On December 22, 2022, Savage was waived.

Career statistics

College

|-
| style="text-align:left;"| 2015–16
| style="text-align:left;"| Austin Peay
| 36 || 7 || 19.7 || .421 || .397 || .806 || 3.0 || .8 || .7 || .0 || 6.4
|-
| style="text-align:left;"| 2016–17
| style="text-align:left;"| Austin Peay
| 29 || 26 || 31.7 || .413 || .358 || .846 || 4.4 || 1.2 || 1.2 || .4 || 10.3
|-
| style="text-align:left;"| 2017–18
| style="text-align:left;"| Western Kentucky
| style="text-align:center;" colspan="11"|  Redshirt
|-
| style="text-align:left;"| 2018–19
| style="text-align:left;"| Western Kentucky
| 34 || 34 || 35.7 || .364 || .360 || .818 || 4.8 || 1.2 || 1.0 || .4 || 12.2
|-
| style="text-align:left;"| 2019–20
| style="text-align:left;"| Western Kentucky
| 30 || 30 || 34.6 || .448 || .396 || .836 || 7.1 || 1.4 || 1.2 || 1.1 || 11.7
|- class="sortbottom"
| style="text-align:center;" colspan="2"| Career
| 129 || 97 || 30.1 || .406 || .376 || .826 || 4.7 || 1.1 || 1.0 || .5 || 10.0

Personal life
His father, Jermaine Savage, played basketball at Austin Peay in the 1990s and was a member of the 1996 NCAA tournament team.

References

External links
Western Kentucky Hilltoppers bio
Austin Peay Governors bio

1997 births
Living people
American expatriate basketball people in Germany
American expatriate basketball people in Greece
American men's basketball players
Austin Peay Governors men's basketball players
Basketball players from Kentucky
Crailsheim Merlins players
Lavrio B.C. players
Shooting guards
Small forwards
Sportspeople from Bowling Green, Kentucky
Western Kentucky Hilltoppers basketball players